Cirsium spinosissimum, common name spiniest thistle, is a European species of thistle which grows in dry rocky areas. It is found in France, Italy, Germany, Switzerland, Austria, and the Balkans.

Leaves, stems, and the sides of the flower head bear long, sharp spines, hence the name of the plant. Flower heads contain numerous disc florets but no ray florets, the florets off-white sometimes with a purple tinge.

References

spinosissimum
Flora of Europe
Plants described in 1753
Taxa named by Carl Linnaeus
Taxa named by Giovanni Antonio Scopoli